Manville High School is a four-year comprehensive community public high school that serves students in ninth through twelfth grades from Manville in Somerset County, New Jersey, United States, operating as the lone secondary school of the Manville School District.

As of the 2021–22 school year, the school had an enrollment of 472 students and 42.9 classroom teachers (on an FTE basis), for a student–teacher ratio of 11.0:1. There were 137 students (29.0% of enrollment) eligible for free lunch and 46 (9.7% of students) eligible for reduced-cost lunch.

Awards, recognition and rankings
The school was the 277th-ranked public high school in New Jersey out of 339 schools statewide in New Jersey Monthly magazine's September 2014 cover story on the state's "Top Public High Schools", using a new ranking methodology. The school had been ranked 201st in the state of 328 schools in 2012, after being ranked 196th in 2010 out of 322 schools listed. The magazine ranked the school 144th in the magazine's September 2008 issue, which surveyed 316 schools across the state.

Athletics
The Manville High School Mustangs compete in the Skyland Conference, which is comprised of public and private high schools spanning Hunterdon, Somerset and Warren counties in northern New Jersey, operating under the jurisdiction of the New Jersey State Interscholastic Athletic Association (NJSIAA). With 312 students in grades 10-12, the school was classified by the NJSIAA for the 2019–20 school year as Group I for most athletic competition purposes, which included schools with an enrollment of 75 to 476 students in that grade range. The football team competes in Division 1B of the Big Central Football Conference, which includes 60 public and private high schools in Hunterdon, Middlesex, Somerset, Union and Warren counties, which are broken down into 10 divisions by size and location. The school was classified by the NJSIAA as Group I South for football for 2018–2020.

The baseball team won the Central Jersey Group I state sectional championship in 1967, 1968 and 1970.

The wrestling team won the Central Jersey Group I sectional championship in 1982 and 1992-1994.

Administration
Core members of the school's administration are:
Adam Wright, Principal
Stephen Venuto, Vice-Principal / Athletic Director

Notable alumni
 Cheryl Chase (born 1958, class of 1977), actress and children's book authors best known for voicing Angelica Pickles in the television series Rugrats and its spinoffs.
 Gerald E. Loeb (class of 1977), neurophysiologist, biomedical engineer, academic and author
 Robert Sikoryak (born 1964, class of 1983), artist who specializes in making comic adaptations of literature classics.

References

External links 
Manville High School
Manville School District

School Data for the Manville School District, National Center for Education Statistics

Manville, New Jersey
Public high schools in Somerset County, New Jersey